Nizhnetavlykayevo (Tübänge Tawlıqay) is a rural locality (a village) in Tavlykayevsky Selsoviet, Baymaksky District, Bashkortostan, Russia. The population was 232 as of 2010. There are 2 streets.

Geography 
Nizhnetavlykayevo is located 25 km northwest of Baymak (the district's administrative centre) by road. Verkhnetavlykayevo is the nearest rural locality.

References 

Rural localities in Baymaksky District